Ralph Moody (1917–2004) was a NASCAR driver and team owner.

Ralph Moody may also refer to:

Ralph Moody (actor) (1886–1971), American actor
Ralph Moody (author) (1898–1982), American author
Ralph E. Moody (1915–1997), politician and judge from Alaska